The Ukrainian-language surname Yeroshenko, also transliterated as Eroshenko or Erochenko, may refer to:

Artem Yeroshenko, Belarusian footballer
Vasili Eroshenko (1890–1952), Russian  anarchist writer, esperantist, linguist, and teacher
, Soviet counter admiral
, Hero of the Soviet Union

See also
 
 
Yaroshenko

Ukrainian-language surnames